Parliamentary elections were held in Iceland on 15 November 1919. Voters elected all 26 seats in the Lower House of the Althing and eight of the fourteen seats in Upper House. The Home Rule Party remained the largest party in the Lower House, winning 10 of the 26 seats.

Results

Notes

References

Elections in Iceland
Iceland
Parliament
Iceland